Sala Baker (born 22 September 1976)  is a New Zealand actor and stuntman. He is best known for portraying the villain Sauron in the Lord of the Rings trilogy by Peter Jackson.

Career
Originally hired as one of several stunt performers for The Lord of the Rings film trilogy, he ended up landing the part of the Dark Lord Sauron. In addition, he also played several Orcs, a Gondorian, and one of the Rohirrim. Outside of The Lord of the Rings trilogy, Baker has performed in The Chronicles of Narnia: The Lion, the Witch and the Wardrobe, two Pirates of the Caribbean movies, Sherlock Holmes: A Game of Shadows, Deadpool 2, Braven, Sleepless, and Mile 22.

Baker was also a part of the miscellaneous crew in the making of The Last Samurai in 2003.

Filmography

Actor

Film

Television

Stunts
 The Lord of the Rings: The Fellowship of the Ring (2001): Stunts
 The Lord of the Rings: The Two Towers (2002): Stunt Performer
 The Lord of the Rings: The Return of the King (2003): Stunts (uncredited)
 Pirates of the Caribbean: The Curse of the Black Pearl (2003): Stunts
 The Chronicles of Narnia: The Lion, the Witch and the Wardrobe (2005): Stunts
 Pirates of the Caribbean: Dead Man's Chest (2006): Stunt Native
 Epic Movie (2007): Stunts
 Deadliest Warrior (2009): Weapons Demonstration
 The A-Team (2010): Stunts

Miscellaneous crew
 The Last Samurai (2003): Location Manager: Split Unit
 The Long and Short of It (2003): Traffic Controller/Grip
 Deadliest Warrior: Shaolin Monk vs Māori Warrior (TV) (2009): Himself, demonstrating Māori weapons

Awards and nominations

References

External links

1976 births
Living people
New Zealand male film actors
New Zealand stunt performers
New Zealand male Māori actors
21st-century New Zealand male actors